This is a timeline of Cambodian history, comprising important legal and territorial changes and political events in Cambodia and its predecessor states. To read about the background to these events, see History of Cambodia. See also the list of kings of Cambodia.

Before 1st century

1st–8th centuries

9th century

10th century

11th century

12th century

13th century

14th century

15th century

16th century

17th century 
Note that names vary considerably from source to source, as do dates.

18th century

19th century

20th century

21st century

References

 
 
 
 

Cambodia history-related lists
Cambodian